Nizip is a town and seat of Nizip District in Gaziantep Province of Turkey. It had a population 109,635 in 2021.

It is located 45 km from the city of Gaziantep, 95 km from Şanlıurfa (Edessa), and 35 km from Karkamış, which is an old city also known historically as Carchemish.

Demographics
In early 20th century, the town housed 15,000 people and was mostly inhabited by Turks.

Notable people 
 Cahit Tanyol, Turkish sociologist
 Celal Doğan (1943*), former mayor of Gaziantep and president of Gaziantep F.K., lawyer, and politician
 Mehmet Ali Yaprak (1949-2004), Turkish businessman and drug trafficker
 Mustafa Cengiz (1949-2021), businessman who served as the president of sports club Galatasaray S.K.  
 Mehmet Görmez (1959*), former President of the Presidency of Religious Affairs and as such legally the highest level Islamic scholar in Turkey and the Turkish Republic of Northern Cyprus. 
 Zihni Çakır (1969*), journalist and author
 Ali Şahin (1970*), Turkish politician who has been Deputy Minister of European Union Affairs since January 2016.
 Abdulhamit Gül (1977*), a Turkish politician. Currently, he is the Minister of Justice. He is a member of the Grand National Assembly of Turkey from Gaziantep.

Gallery

See also 
Battle of Nizip

References

Populated places in Gaziantep Province
Nizip District
Aleppo vilayet